James Island is one of the San Juan Islands in San Juan County, Washington, United States. It lies in Rosario Strait just off the eastern shore of Decatur Island and west of the city of Anacortes. The entire island comprises James Island State Park of the Washington State Park System. The island has no potable water or residents. It has three different camping areas, each with at least one toilet. The camping areas combine for a total of 13 campsites and are connected by a loop trail. James Island was named by Charles Wilkes in 1841 to commemorate the naval hero Reuben James. The property was transferred from the federal government to the Washington State Parks and Recreation Commission in 1964.

References

External links

James Island State Park Washington State Parks and Recreation Commission 
James Island State Park Map Washington State Parks and Recreation Commission 
James Island Marine State Park  San Juan Sufficiency

San Juan Islands
Uninhabited islands of Washington (state)
State parks of Washington (state)
Parks in San Juan County, Washington
Protected areas established in 1964
1964 establishments in Washington (state)